The Ohio idea was an idea by poor Midwesterners during the US presidential election of 1868 to redeem federal war bonds in United States dollars, also known as greenbacks, rather than gold. Agrarian Democrats hoped to keep more money in circulation in order to keep interest rates lower.

In summary, wealthy eastern delegates demanded a plank promising that federal war bonds be redeemed in gold-even though many of the bonds had been purchased with badly depreciated paper greenbacks. Poorer Midwestern delegates answered with the "Ohio Idea," which called for redemption in greenbacks. Debt-burdened agrarian Democrats hoped to keep more money in circulation and keep interest rates lower. This dispute later showed a bitter fight over the money policy that would fight the Republic and cause disagreement until the century's end.

References 

Political history of the United States